John Edward Lamb (December 26, 1852 – August 23, 1914) was an American lawyer who served one term as a U.S. Representative from Indiana from 1883 to 1885.

Biography
Born in Terre Haute, Indiana, Lamb attended the common schools and was graduated from the Terre Haute High School. He studied law and was admitted to the bar in 1873, commencing practice in Terre Haute. He served as prosecuting attorney of the fourteenth judicial circuit 1875-1880.

Congress 
Lamb was elected as a Democrat to the Forty-eighth Congress (March 4, 1883 – March 3, 1885).

Later career and death 
Afterwards, he resumed the practice of law in Terre Haute. He was appointed United States district attorney for Indiana July 10, 1885, and served until August 16, 1886. He served as delegate to the Democratic National Conventions in 1892, 1896, 1904, 1908, and 1912.

He died in Terre Haute, Indiana, August 23, 1914, and was interred in Calvary Cemetery.

References

1852 births
1914 deaths
Politicians from Terre Haute, Indiana
Democratic Party members of the United States House of Representatives from Indiana
United States Attorneys for the District of Indiana
19th-century American politicians
Burials in Indiana